Belić is a Serbo-Croatian surname, derived from the word belo, meaning "white". It may refer to:

Aleksandar Belić (1876–1960), Serbian linguist
Branislav Belić (1932-2016), Serbian politician
Danilo Belić (born 1980), Serbian football player
Dušan Belić (born 1971), Serbian football goalkeeper
James Belich (1927–2015), New Zealand politician
James Belich (born 1956), New Zealand historian
Jordanka Belić (born 1964), Serbian and German chess grandmaster
Kristijan Belić (born 2001), Serbian professional footballer
Luka Belić (born 1988), Croatian tennis player
Luka Belić (born 1996), Serbian football forward
Milan Belić (born 1977), Serbian football forward
Miroslav Belić (1940-2020), Serbian lawyer and basketball player
Nemanja Belić (born 1987), Serbian footballer
Roko Belic (born 1971), American film director, producer, cinematographer, and actor
Svetomir Belić (born 1946), Serbian former boxer
Tomáš Belic (born 1978), Slovak footballer

In popular culture
 Niko Bellic, a character in a video game Grand Theft Auto IV

See also
Belich
Bijelić, surname
Balić, surname
Bilić (surname)
Bolić, surname
Bulić, surname

Serbian surnames
Croatian surnames
Slovak-language surnames